Tryonia alamosae, common name the Alamosa springsnail, is a species of small freshwater snail, an aquatic prosobranch gastropod mollusk in the family Hydrobiidae.

The species is endemic to Socorro County, New Mexico in the United States, where only one population is known. It was placed on the federal endangered species list along with the Socorro springsnail in 1991.

The snail occurs in five small connected springs within half a mile of each other; this is thought to be a single population. The snail was discovered in 1979 and described to science as a new species in 1987.

References

Further reading 

 Species profile at U. S. Fish and Wildlife Service

Tryonia
Endemic fauna of New Mexico
Socorro County, New Mexico
Gastropods described in 1987
Taxonomy articles created by Polbot